Mycetagroicus is a genus of fungus-growing ants in the subfamily Myrmicinae.

Systematics
 Mycetagroicus cerradensis Brandão & Mayhé-Nunes, 2001
 Mycetagroicus inflatus Brandão & Mayhé-Nunes, 2008
 Mycetagroicus triangularis Brandão & Mayhé-Nunes, 2001
 Mycetagroicus urbanus Brandão & Mayhé-Nunes, 2001

References

External links

Myrmicinae
Ant genera